Johan

 Johan (given name)
 Johan (film), a 1921 Swedish film directed by Mauritz Stiller
 Johan (band), a Dutch pop-group
 Johan (album), a 1996 album by the group
 Johan Peninsula, Ellesmere Island, Nunavut, Canada
 Jo-Han, a manufacturer of plastic scale model kits

See also
 John (name)